Benjamin August Gimmerthal (1779, Zittau- 1848, Riga (then Russian Empire)) was a German entomologist who specialised  in Diptera.
His collection of Chloropidae is held by the Museum of Systematic Zoology, University of Latvia, Riga. The remaining Diptera and other insects by the Natural History Museum of Latvia (Homepage)

Works
partial list
Gimmerthal B.A. (1842). Uebersicht der Zweifluegler (Diptera Ln) Lief- und Kurlands. Bulletin de la Société des naturalistes de Moscou 15: 639-659.
Gimmerthal, B.A. (1845) Erster Beitrag zu einer Künftig zu Bearbeitenden Dipterologie Russlands. Bulletin de la Société Impériale des Naturalistes de Moscou 18, 287–331.
Gimmerthal B.A. (1847). Vierter Beitrag zur Dipterologie Russlands Bulletin de la Société des naturalistes de Moscou 20: 140-208.

References
Evenhuis, N. L. 1997: Litteratura taxonomica dipterorum (1758-1930). Volume 1 (A-K); Volume 2 (L-Z). 1; 2 Leiden, Backhuys Publishers, VII+1-426; 427-871 S., B15:A2283:1,2, pp. 1: 301-303, Schr.verz.
 Spuris, Z. 1997: [Gimmerthal, B. A.] Latvijas Entomol. Arhivs 4, pp. 49–51.

German entomologists
1848 deaths
1779 births
Dipterists